The Ngozi Geothermal Power Station is a planned  geothermal power plant in Tanzania, which is expandable to  in future.

Location
The coordinates of Ngozi Crater are: 09°00'30.0"S, 33°33'11.0"E (Latitude:-9.008333; Longitude:33.553056).

Overview
TGDC will sell the steam to a consortium comprising the Government of Tanzania, a strategic investor and one or more development partners.

The consortium will then generate electricity from the steam at this power station. The electricity will be sold to the Tanzania Electric Supply Company Limited, for integration in the Tanzania national grid. In phase I of development the power station will start with generating capacity of 200 megawatts, which will be stepped up to 600 megawatts in phase II.

Cost and funding
The Tanzanian government has budgeted US$821 million for the development of this power station up to 600 megawatt capacity. During the exploration phase, US$21.73 million was spent on preliminary studies. Of that, the Climate Investment Fund loaned US$5 million and the African Development Bank granted $16.73 million.

See also

List of power stations in Tanzania

References

External links
The Business Case For Ngozi Geothermal Power Project, Mbeya, Tanzania As of 2016.

Geothermal power stations in Tanzania
Power stations in Tanzania
Mbeya Region